Eritrea competed at the 2011 World Championships in Athletics from August 27 to September 4 in Daegu, South Korea.

Team selection

A team of 9 athletes was
announced to represent the country
in the event.  The team will be led by Zersenay Tadese, a 2009 World
Championships 10,000m silver medallist, and Olympic bronze medalist.

The following athletes appeared on the preliminary Entry List, but not on the Official Start List of the specific event:

Results

Men

References

External links
Official local organising committee website
Official IAAF competition website

Nations at the 2011 World Championships in Athletics
World Championships in Athletics
Eritrea at the World Championships in Athletics